Adiwarna is the fourth studio album from Malaysian pop singer Siti Nurhaliza released in 1998.

Featuring hit song, "Purnama Merindu", the first one recorded for this album. "Diari Hatimu" was originally intended for her second album, but never made it then, so, it's re-recorded for this album. Siti Nurhaliza wrote the lyrics for the second song, entitled "Lagu Ku Di Hatimu".

Adiwarna would be the fourth studio recorded album by Siti Nurhaliza and her third Pop album. It has been launched in 1998.  The featured album has been selected for the Best Album of The Year during AIM 1999.  It has also received 4 Platinum Award Album "Adiwarna" of its successful sales.

Production
Adiwarna was recorded by Siti Nurhaliza, with her mentor Adnan Abu Hassan handling the arrangement and composed three songs. The album containing 10 songs, Siti once again collaborating with Adnan, LY, Johari Teh and Azmeer and other composers, while explaining her new album gave a thousand of meanings.

In an interview with Utusan Malaysia on 20 June 1998, Siti said she choose Adiwarna, which means "very good" or "very beautiful" as the title for her fourth solo album, while explaining that the term to describe all beauties in art of music that should be featured. Besides that, she said Adiwarna is also a diversity of art in an album as trying to show this time. She said: "This is not the traditional album but ordinary pop album, simply titled only a relatively classic and Malay heritage,". By selecting Malay elements term as the title of the album, Siti had opportunity to re-popularize many old word that has been forgotten.

Reception
Adiwarna was released on 29 June 1998, just six months after Siti Nurhaliza set up her company bearing her name, Siti Nurhaliza Productions, the album was a commercial success. Over 200,000 units sold, Adiwarna also peaked at number one on RIM's local album chart. The album later sold more than 300,000 units in Indonesian market.

To promote the album, four songs in the album – "Purnama Merindu", "Diari Hatimu", "Satu Cinta Dua Jiwa" and "Sendiri" was released as the main singles and later made into music videos. Her further singles – "Lagu Ku Di Hatimu", "Demi Kasih Sayang", "Kita Kan Bersama" and "Gelora Asmara" also were made into music videos. "Satu Cinta Dua Jiwa", the third single in the album were translated into English as "We'll be as One". It was later on sent for the South Pacific International Song and Singing Competition held in Australia which made her to receive 2 awards.

The album's fourth single, "Sendiri" was released in Indonesia and retitled as "Mencintaimu Selamanya".  "Diari Hatimu", the second single in the album faced criticism when Siti accused for plagiarism to the song owing the similarities with "Rindang Tak Berbuah" sung by Indonesian singer, Kirey. However, the controversy began to answered when the composer, Ferdi Khalid NS is the same person who composed both songs, for the Malaysian version, the music and lyrics was rearranged while the melody remains unchanged.

Critical response
Zainal Alam Kadir, writing for New Straits Times gave Adiwarna a 3-star rating. He called the songs in the album as ordinary, but since they were sung by Siti, they sounded fresh and different.

Track listing

Credits and personnel
Credits adapted from Adiwarna booklet liner notes.

 Andy – photography
 Ariffin – promotional unit
 Azmeer – producer
 Baiduri – songwriter
 Bard – promotional unit
 Adnan Abu Hassan – producer
 Azlan Abu Hassan – producer
 Hazida – songwriter
 Sham Amir Hussain – A & R manager, songwriter
 Hana Creative Image – image
 Joe – promotional unit
 Joey – make-up, hair stylist
 Juwie – songwriter
 Lau – engineer
 L.Y. – producer
 Tan Su Loke – executive producer

 Hani MJ – songwriter
 Nieta – promotional unit
 Siti Nurhaliza – songwriter
 Ferdi Khalid NS – producer, songwriter
 Malek Osman – producer
 Andy Pok – mastering
 AS Design & Print – creation
 Lukhman S – songwriter
 Salman – producer
 Johari Teh – producer
 Tina – promotional unit
 Ucu – songwriter
 Vincent – engineer, mixing
 Wong – engineer, mixing
 Zuriani – producer

Awards 
AIM 1999
 Best Female Vocal Performance
 Best Pop Album (Adiwarna)
 Best Album (Adiwarna)

Asia Pacific Song Competition (Australia) 1999
 Best Female Vocal Performance (We’ll Be As One)
 Winner of the Pop/Top 40 International Song Chart – We'll Be As One

Anugerah Juara Lagu 1999
 Best Ballad (Purnama Merindu)

Shanghai Music Festival (China) 1999
 Gold Winner (Purnama Merindu)

Anugerah Carta RIM
 Best Sold Malay Album (Adiwarna)

Voice of Asia (Kazakhstan)
 Grand Prix Winner (Purnama Merindu)

Explanatory notes

References

External links
 Siti Nurhaliza- Official Website
 Siti Nurhaliza  Collections

1998 albums
Siti Nurhaliza albums
Suria Records albums
Malay-language albums